Michal Pavlíček (born 14 February 1956) is a Czech guitarist, musical composer, singer, lyricist, and producer. He is considered to be an accomplished guitarist and holds numerous awards.

Career
Pavlíček, a FAMU graduate, broke onto the music scene in the mid-1970s and made his name as part of the rock band Pražský výběr, who were officially banned in communist Czechoslovakia.

Pavlíček is also the founder of the bands Stromboli and Big Heads, and since 1992 has been a member of BSP, together with Kamil Střihavka and  Ota Balage.

As a songwriter, Pavlíček has contributed to the careers of such artists as Bára Basiková, Zuzana Michnová, Monika Načeva, Jana Koubková, Daniel Hůlka, and Richard Müller.
He has also composed music for various theatre productions, ballets, television shows, and feature films, including Václav Havel's Leaving.

In addition to working on local productions, the artist has also written music for several foreign shows, including the BBC's Merlin and The Scarlet Pimpernel.

Pavlíček has recorded a number of solo albums. He has been inducted into the Beatová síň slávy as well as winning the Anděl Award in 2015 for lifetime achievement.

In 2008, he published his autobiography, Země vzdálené (Faraway Lands).

Selected discography

with Pražský výběr
 Žízeň (1978)
 Výběr (1987)
 Pražský výběr (1988)
 Běr (1997)

with Stromboli
 Stromboli (1987)
 Shutdown (1989)
 Fiat Lux (2014)

with Big Heads
 Big Heads (1992)
 Čombió (2001)

with BSP
 BSP I (1993)
 BSP II (1994)

Solo
 Minotaurus (1990)
 Strange Pleasure of Living (1991)
 Imagination (1992)
 Konec velkých prázdnin (1996)
 The Scarlet Pimpernel (1999)
 Zvláštní radost žít II (2002)
 Beatová síň slávy (2006)
 Srdeční záležitosti (2010)
 Pošli to tam! (2019)

Musicals and ballets
 Symphonic Variations (1997)
 Excalibur (2003)
 Obraz Doriana Graye (2005)
 Malý princ (2005)
 Dáma s kaméliemi (2007)

References

External links

 
 

1956 births
Living people
Czech film score composers
Male film score composers
Czech guitarists
Male guitarists
Czech rock musicians